Wildfire is a 1986 American animated series produced by Hanna-Barbera about the adventures of Sara, a 13-year-old girl growing up in the American West as she discovers her true identity as a princess-in-hiding from another realm who is destined to fight the evil witch Lady Diabolyn. The show was first broadcast on CBS for 13 episodes from September 13 to December 6, 1986.

Plot
As a baby, Princess Sara (voiced by Georgi Irene) of Thurinia was saved from the clutches of the evil Lady Diabolyn (voiced by Jessica Walter) by a mystical talking horse named Wildfire (voiced by John Vernon) following the death of Sara's mother Queen Sarana (voiced by Amanda McBroom). Wildfire took her away from the planet Dar-Shan and deposited her in Montana where she is taken in by a farmer named John Cavanaugh (voiced by David Ackroyd). Lady Diabolyn was a stepsister to Queen Sarana, whom she always considered weak and unfit to rule. To gain her "rightful" throne, she learned dark magic and allied herself with the demonic Spectres.

Twelve years later when Sara was ready to fight evil, Wildfire brought her back to Dar-Shan to regain her kingdom. Wildfire summons Sara through her magic amulet and transports her across dimensions to her real home in Dar-Shan. Sara joins with her friends consisting of a sorcerer named Alvinar (voiced by René Auberjonois), a young boy named Dorin (voiced by Bobby Jacoby), and his cowardly colt Brutus (voiced by Susan Blu) in order to thwart her wicked step-aunt. John and Sara's Indian friend Ellen (voiced by Lilly Moon) provide moral support on Earth.

Lady Diabolyn is helped by the Goons, mischievous creatures consisting of Dweedle (voiced by Billy Barty), Nerts, Booper, Mudlusk (voiced by Frank Welker), and Thimble. They were formerly Diabolyn's personal guards until they gained their monstrous appearances by the Spectres upon opening the urn containing them when Diabolyn told them not to.

Each episode revealed more and more of the mythical world of Dar-Shan and gave its audience a new puzzle piece to help reason out the past events that led up to the current state of affairs. It was later revealed that Sara's adopted father John was actually her biological father Prince Cavan sent to Earth to protect him from the curse which Lady Diabolyn and the Spectres had placed on Dar-Shan. Sara and Wildfire are the only ones who know John's true identity which has been kept secret even from him.

Episodes

Voice cast
 David Ackroyd as John Cavanaugh / Prince Cavan
 René Auberjonois as Alvinar
 Billy Barty as Dweedle
 Susan Blu as Brutus
 Townsend Coleman as Goon
 Georgi Irene as Princess Sara
 Bobby Jacoby as Dorin
 Lilly Moon as Ellen
 Rob Paulsen as Goon
 John Vernon as Wildfire
 Jessica Walter as Lady Diabolyn
 Frank Welker as Mudlusk

Additional voices
 Remy Auberjonois
 Victoria Carroll - Mrs. Ashworth
 Louise Chamis - Stubb's Mom (in "Dragons of Dar-Shan")
 Philip Clarke - Lord Samson
 Gino Conforti
 Keene Curtis - Mr. Specs (in "Where the Dreams Come From")
 Jennifer Darling
 Jerry Dexter
 George DiCenzo - Aragon (in "The Highwayman")
 Paul Eiding
 Dick Erdman
 Bernard Erhard - Rothadode (in "Wildfire: King of the Horses")
 Melanie Gaffin
 Dick Gautier
 Barbara Goodson - Nerissa (in "The Name is the Game")
 Scott Grimes
 Noah Hathaway
 Darryl Hickman
 Laura Jacoby
 Lauri Johnson
 Aron Kincaid
 Ron Leibman
 Marilyn Lightstone - Jude (in "Secret of Sinti Magic")
 June Lockhart - Vesta
 Kenneth Mars
 Janet May
 Amanda McBroom - Queen Sarana (in "A Meeting in Time")
 Marissa Mendenhall
 Michael Mish
 Daniel O'Herlihy - Jovar
 Diane Pershing - Lady Aura (in "Strangers in the Night")
 Brock Peters - Thunderbolt (in "Wildfire: King of the Horses")
 Peter Renaday
 Peter Mark Richman
 Bob Ridgely
 Josh Rodine - Stubb (in "Dragons of Dar-Shan")
 Roger Rose - Halavax (in "The Highwayman")
 Neilson Ross
 Will Ryan
 William Schallert
 Brandon Stewart
 Alexandra Stoddart - Sheriel (in "The Ogre's Bride")
 Andre Stojka
 Jeffrey Tambor - Oberon (in "A Visit to Wonderland")
 Les Tremayne - Bildad (in "Dragons of Dar-Shan")
 Ginny Tyler
 Ted Zeigler

Reception
According to the Los Angeles Times, "despite the hackneyed writing and poor animation (the artists don't understand how a horse moves), Wildfire is sure to be a hit with little girls, its obvious audience".

References

External links
 

1980s American animated television series
1986 American television series debuts
1986 American television series endings
1980s American science fiction television series
American children's animated action television series
American children's animated adventure television series
American children's animated science fantasy television series
CBS original programming
Animated television series about horses
Hanna-Barbera superheroes
Television series by Hanna-Barbera
Television shows set in Montana